Genni Gunn is a Canadian novelist, poet, and translator.

Born in Trieste, Italy, she currently resides in Vancouver, British Columbia. Gunn has a B.F.A. and an M.F.A. from the University of British Columbia. She is chair of Public Lending Rights, a member of The Writers' Union of Canada and the Literary Translators' Association of Canada and PEN International.

Her 2020 short story collection Permanent Tourist was shortlisted for the 2021 ReLit Award for short fiction.

Bibliography

Novels
 Thrice Upon a Time (1990), 
 Tracing Iris (2001), 
 Solitaria (2010),

Short stories
 On the Road (1991), 
 Hungers (2002), 
 Permanent Tourists (2020)

Short stories in multiple-author anthologies
"Stones" (2008), Exotic Gothic 2 (ed. Danel Olson),  hardbound,  paperback
"Water Lover" (May 2012), Exotic Gothic 4 (ed. Danel Olson),  hardbound,  slipcased & signed edition
"Beached" (2012), Room Magazine

Poetry
 Mating in Captivity (1993), 
 Faceless (2007), 
 Accidents (2022) ISBN 978-1-773240-98-5

Translations
 Devour Me Too, by Dacia Maraini (1987)
 Traveling in the Gait of a Fox, by Dacia Maraini (1992)
 Text Me, by Corrado Calabrò, 2014

Opera libretto
 Alternate Visions (2007) (music by John Oliver) Produced by Chants Libres, Montreal.

Travel memoir
 Tracks: Journeys in Time and Place (2013),

References

External links
 Author's website
 Gunn at English-Canadian Writers, Athabasca University, by Joseph Pivato, 2015; with additional links

20th-century Canadian novelists
21st-century Canadian novelists
20th-century Canadian poets
21st-century Canadian poets
Canadian women poets
Canadian women novelists
Living people
Writers from Trieste
University of British Columbia alumni
20th-century Canadian women writers
21st-century Canadian women writers
20th-century Canadian translators
21st-century Canadian translators
Canadian women non-fiction writers
Year of birth missing (living people)